Leopold Leonardus Petronella van Asten (born 19 October 1976 in Venray) is a Dutch show jumping equestrian.

Van Asten represented the Netherlands at the 2004 Summer Olympics where he took part in the individual jumping competition and the show jumping team event, alongside Gerco Schröder, Wim Schröder and Gert-Jan Bruggink. As an individual, on his horse Joel, Van Asten reached the final where he ended on the 30th position. With the Dutch show jumping team he finished fourth with a total of 24 penalty points.

External links
Van Asten at the Dutch Olympic Archive

1976 births
Living people
People from Venray
Dutch show jumping riders
Olympic equestrians of the Netherlands
Dutch male equestrians
Equestrians at the 2004 Summer Olympics
Sportspeople from Limburg (Netherlands)
21st-century Dutch people